Ritual is the thirteenth studio album by German Neue Deutsche Härte band Oomph!.

The title was announced in a post on the band's official Facebook page on 15 November 2018. The band had earlier said they expected the album to release on 18 January 2019. On the following day, the official artwork for the album and a track listing, pre-order URL, and a segment of upcoming single "Kein Liebeslied" (Not a love song) were released, as well as reconfirming the release date. "Kein Liebeslied" was released on 30 November 2018 as the album's first single. The album's second single "Tausend Mann und ein Befehl" was released on 4 January 2019. All songs were released on January 18.
At the end of its release week, Ritual became the band's first #1 album, in their native Germany.

Ritual is the last Oomph! album to feature singer Dero Goi, following his departure in 2021.

Track listing

Bonus tracks
These tracks are included on the digital download, digipak CD, vinyl, and limited edition box set releases. 

In addition, the limited edition box set features a 7" vinyl with the exclusive song "Ich bin ein Fels" ("I Am a Rock").

Tour

The band toured in support of the album in the following locations and dates

1 March 2019 – Capitol, Hanover, Germanya
2 Mar – Astra, Berlin, Germanya
3 Mar – Markthalle Hamburg, Hamburg, Germanya
5 Mar – Zeche, Bochum, Germanya
6 Mar – Schlachthof, Weisbaden, Germanya
8 Mar – Im Wizemann, Stuttgart, Germanya
9 Mar – Backstage Werk, Munich, Germanya
10 Mar – Kraftwerk Mitte, Dresden, Germanya
12 Mar – Taubchenthal, Leipzig, Germanya
13 Mar – Hirs'ch, Nuremberg, Germanya
15 Mar – Live Music Hall, Cologne, Germanya
16 Mar – Iduna, Drachten, Netherlandsa
17 Mar – La Laiterie, Strasbourg, Franceb
19 Mar – O2 Academy Islington, London, UKb
20 Mar – La Machine, Paris, Franceb
22 Mar – Sala Mon, Madrid, Spainc
23 Mar – Razzmatazz 2, Barcelona, Spainc
24 Mar – Ninkasi Kao, Lyon, Franceb
26 Mar – Kofmehl, Solothurn, Switzerlandb
28 Mar – Conrad-Sohm, Dornbirn, Austriab
29 Mar – Nová Chmelnice, Prague, Czech Republicb
30 Mar – Dark Electro Festival, Warsaw, Poland

a: with Nervenbeisser b: with Heldmaschine c: with Mind Driller

Charts

References

Oomph! albums
Napalm Records albums
2019 albums
German-language albums